The Ute Mountain Fire Tower is a fire lookout tower in the Ashley National Forest in western Daggett County, Utah, United States, southwest of Manila, that is listed on the National Register of Historic Places.

Description
The tower was built in 1937 and was added to the National Register of Historic Places on April 10, 1980.

See also

 National Register of Historic Places listings in Daggett County, Utah

References

External link

Park buildings and structures on the National Register of Historic Places in Utah
Government buildings completed in 1937
Towers completed in 1937
Buildings and structures in Daggett County, Utah
Civilian Conservation Corps in Utah
Fire lookout towers in Utah
Fire lookout towers on the National Register of Historic Places
National Register of Historic Places in Daggett County, Utah